Fillet Show is the debut album of the Champaign, Illinois based post-hardcore band Hum, released in 1991. It is their only official release to feature original frontman Andy Switzky.

Track listing
"Space Fuck" – 4:29
"Formaldehyde" – 2:27
"Detassler" – 2:32
"Staring at the Sun" – 2:39
"Hortense" – 3:35
"King of Night" – 2:45
"Lip Saga" – 4:06
"I Like It" – 2:48	
"Pocket" – 5:55

Personnel
Hum
Balthazar De Lay – bass, vocals, photography
Bryan St. Pere – drums
Andy Switzky – guitar, vocals
Matt Talbott – guitar, vocals

Additional personnel
Teak Philips – photography
Kent Whitesell – engineering, mixing, production

External links

1991 debut albums
Hum (band) albums